"Esclavo y amo" (English: "Slave and master") is a song written by Mexican songwriter José Vaca Flores and originally recorded by Ranchera singer Javier Solís for his 1962 album El Peor De Los Caminos. The song, which was Vaca Flores' first hit as a songwriter and also became one of Solis' most emblematic songs, would eventually become an standard of the Mexican popular repertoire.

The lyrics are about a man who is deeply infatuated with a woman, who makes him feel both "slave and master of the universe".

Los Pasteles Verdes version

In 1975, Peruvian group Los Pasteles Verdes covered "Esclavo y amo", which was released as a single from their second studio album Vol. II. Their version, which departs from the mariachi instrumentation of the original Javier Solis' version and instead has a more psychedelic style typical of 70s Latin romantic groups, re-popularized the song in Mexico, where it topped the airplay charts in 1976.

Chart performance

Pepe Aguilar version

In 2000, Mexican singer Pepe Aguilar covered the song for his album "Lo Grande de los Grandes". His version, which was also released as a single and features a mariachi instrumentation more reminiscent of Javier Solís' original version, was one of the winners of the 2002 BMI Latin Awards.

Chart performance

Other versions
The song has also been recorded by artists such as Vicente Fernández, Manoella Torres, Lupillo Rivera, Marco Antonio Muñiz, Leo Dan and Amanda Miguel, among others.

See also
List of number-one hits of 1976 (Mexico)

References 

1961 songs
1975 singles
2000 singles
Pepe Aguilar songs
Mexican songs
Spanish-language songs